Lennart Vilhelm Hannelius (8 November 1893 – 4 May 1950) was a Finnish sport shooter who competed in the 1924 Summer Olympics. He won the bronze medal in the 25 m rapid fire pistol event.

References

External links
profile

1893 births
1950 deaths
Finnish male sport shooters
ISSF pistol shooters
Olympic shooters of Finland
Shooters at the 1924 Summer Olympics
Olympic bronze medalists for Finland
Olympic medalists in shooting
Medalists at the 1924 Summer Olympics